Maspalomas Fútbol Sala was a futsal club based in Las Palmas, Canary Islands. Better known as Maspalomas Sol Europa, it became one of the most important futsal clubs from Spain.

The club was also known as Maspalomas Palm Oasis in 1995–96 season.

History
Maspalomas Fútbol Sala was founded in 1985. One of first sponsors was Muebles El Norte. They were a habitual team in RFEF futsal league. After the unification of futsal leagues, they were chosen to compete in new División de Honor. In 1993–94 season, Maspalomas Sol Europa won the national championship. In 1996–97 season, Maspalomas Sol Europa qualified for play-offs for the title, but were eliminated in Semifinals. In 1998–99, the team were relegated to División de Plata. However, shortly before to start 1999–2000 season, Maspalomas FS merged with Disoft CFS. In the past several seasons, the team played in División de Plata as Disoft Las Palmas. 2003–04 season was the last for Maspalomas FS, the club was dissolved due to large debts.

Season to season

9 seasons in División de Honor
5 seasons in División de Plata
1 season in 1ª Nacional A

Trophies
División de Honor: 1
Winners: 1993–94
Copa de España: 1
Winners: 1996–97
Supercopa de España: 0
Runners-Up: 1994–95, 1997–98
European Championship: 0
Runners-Up: 1994–95

References

External links
Disoft former official website
Merger with Didoft CFS
Disoft Maspalomas Costa Canaria Profile

Futsal clubs in Spain
Sport in Las Palmas
Futsal clubs established in 1985
Sports clubs disestablished in 2004
1985 establishments in Spain
2004 disestablishments in Spain
Sport in Gran Canaria
Sports teams in the Canary Islands